Hjerpe Grocery is a historic grocery store building at 110 & 112 N Main in Lindsborg, Kansas.  The building in an early commercial building which features Late 19th and Early 20th Century American styles. It was built around 1930 and was added to the National Register of Historic Places in 2010.

It was deemed notable "as an intact example of Commercial Style Architecture" and "for its association with the early commerce of Lindsborg, Kansas, a Swedish-American community founded in 1869."

References

Commercial buildings on the National Register of Historic Places in Kansas
Late 19th and Early 20th Century American Movements architecture
Buildings designated early commercial in the National Register of Historic Places in Kansas
Buildings and structures completed in 1930
Buildings and structures in McPherson County, Kansas
Lindsborg, Kansas
National Register of Historic Places in McPherson County, Kansas